The 2017–18 season was the 116th season of competitive association football in Spain.

Promotion and relegation

Pre-season

National teams

Spain national football team

Results and fixtures

2018 FIFA World Cup qualification (UEFA) Group G

Spain women's national football team

2019 FIFA Women's World Cup qualification (UEFA) Group 7

FIFA competitions

2017 FIFA Club World Cup

Semifinals

Final

UEFA competitions

2017–18 UEFA Champions League

Play-off round

|}

Group stage

Group C

Group D

Group E

Group H

Knockout phase

Round of 16

|}

Quarter-finals

|}

Semi-finals

|}

Final

The final will be played at the NSC Olimpiyskiy Stadium in Kyiv on 26 May 2018. The "home" team (for administrative purposes) was determined by an additional draw held after the semi-final draw.

2017–18 UEFA Europa League

Third qualifying round

|}

Play-off round

|}

Group stage

Group A

Group J

Group L

Knockout phase

Round of 32

|}

Round of 16

|}

Quarter-finals

|}

Semi-finals

|}

Final

The final will be played at the Parc Olympique Lyonnais in Décines-Charpieu on 16 May 2018. The "home" team (for administrative purposes) was determined by an additional draw held after the semi-final draw.

2017–18 UEFA Youth League

Finals

2017 UEFA Super Cup

2017–18 UEFA Women's Champions League

Knockout phase

Round of 32

|}

Round of 16

|}

Quarter-finals

|}

Men's football

League season

La Liga

Segunda División

Promotion play-offs

Segunda División B

Group champions' play-offs

Cup competitions

Copa del Rey

Final

Supercopa de España

First leg

Second leg

Real Madrid won the Supercopa de España 5–1 on aggregate

Copa Federación de España 

|}

Women's football

League season

Primera División

Segunda División

Group of four teams for promotion

Group of three teams for promotion

Cup competitions

Copa de la Reina

References

External links
La Liga
Royal Spanish Football Federation

 
Football
Football
Spain